The Ada County Highway District (ACHD) is the only countywide highway district in Idaho. Located in Garden City, Idaho, it is a government agency established in 1971 as an independent government entity.

Overview
ACHD covers the entirety of Ada County, including the six cities within it, and it is responsible for short-range planning, construction, maintenance and improvements to Ada County's local roads and bridges (excluding state highways like Eagle Road, Interstate 84, the Connector and overpasses, which are operated by the Idaho Transportation Department). 

This makes Ada County the only place in the United States where cities do not control their own streets. This has led to lawsuits and various other political fights over the years as mayors and city councils can not properly respond to their constituents. The district was subject to an attempt to dissolve it via referendum in the early 2000s. The agency has been subject to numerous attempts by cities in Ada County to overturn some or all of its authorities through the Idaho Legislature. None of these efforts have been successful to-date. 

This infrastructure includes facilities that range from multi-lane, arterial streets with a computerized signal system, to narrow, farm-to-market roadways. This system includes several cul-de-sacs that increase operation and maintenance costs, adding to the tax burden placed upon the citizens of Ada County. This poorly-connected road system increases operating costs for other public services such as utilities, trash collection, and school busing.

Organization

Five commissioners loosely govern the district. Together, they are responsible for guiding the planning, development and implementation of transportation facilities throughout the county. Elections are held every two years on a rotating basis, and each commissioner represents a separate subdistrict.

Because strong public involvement is crucial to the transportation planning process, the commissioners and staff regularly host and attend meetings and public hearings to gather feedback from citizens. This is often ceremonial and very rarely leads to substantive changes to projects and plans that are under consideration by the district. The commissioners also hold regular public meetings at the district's headquarters, and participate in joint meetings with municipal and county officials, frequently voting on items for which there is limited information given to them or the citizens as to what the decision will result in. While the district has the authority to sign plats submitted as part of development applications, this is largely a meaningless endeavor as the district has no authority to deny development due to past legal decisions stating cities and the county have the final say in all road design decisions pertaining to new development. 

An appointed director, who serves as chief administrator, manages the district on a day-to-day basis. The director is responsible for managing five departments: Administration, Engineering, Maintenance and Operations, Traffic, and Planning and Development, which combined total nearly 300 employees.

Budget
The ACHD's fiscal year begins October 1 and runs through the end of September.

References

External links
 
 Treasure Valley Ride Sharing - Commuteride.com

Transportation in Ada County, Idaho